The Department of Physics at the University of Houston is a department of the University of Houston College of Natural Sciences and Mathematics performing research traditional fields such as High Energy Physics and Condensed Matter Physics, Material Science, and Biological Physics, but also topics like Seismic and Medical Imaging.  With its physics program, the University of Houston physics department placed 60 (out of 160) in the 2010 United States National Research Council rankings.
The Department works together closely with the Texas Center for Superconductivity.

Research 
The research at the University of Houston's Department of Physics can be structured as
 Biological and Medical Physics: A Bensoula, S. Curran, M. Das, A. Ignatiev, J. Miller, D. Starikov. K. Bassler, M. Cheung, M. Das, G. Gunaratne, W. P. Su, G. C. Morrison
 High Energy, Medium Energy and Heavy Ion Physics: R. Bellwied, E. Hungerford, K. Lau, L. Pinsky, A. Timmins,   L. Whitehead. C. Ordonez
 Nanophysics: A. Bensoula, S. Curran, A. Freundlich, A. Ignatiev, H. Peng, D. Starikov, O. Varghese. M. Cheung
 Seismic Physics: A. Weglein
 Renewable Energy: A. Bensoula, S. Curran, R. Forrest, A. Freundlich, V. Selvamanickam, D. Starikov, D. Stokes, O. Varghese. M. Cheung, S. Curran, A. Freundlich.
 Planetary Science, Space Physics and Radiation Physics
 Econophysics, Statistical and Non-Linear Physics, Complexity & Network Science: S. Curran. M. Cheung, K. Bassler, E. Brittner, G. Gunaratne, B. Hu, V. Lubchenko, J. McCauley, G.C. Morrison
 Superconductivity: Paul Chu (朱經武), C. W. Chu, W. K. Chu, P. Hor, J. Miller, S. H. Pan. K. Bassler, G. F. Reiter, W. P. Su, C. S. Ting

Teaching 
The department offers a bachelor of science degree in physics, possibly with a geophysics specialization, and a bachelor of arts degree in physics. In the near future there will also be a bachelor of science degree in computational physics. At the graduate level, the department offers a master of science and doctorate of philosophy in physics.

In the press 
Prof.  Oomman Varghese and Maggie Paulose are listed on Thomson Reuters 2014 list of highly cited researchers in materials science, and also included on the list of the World’s Most Influential Scientific Minds as the University of Houston's president Renu Khator pointed out in her fall address in 2014.

Prof. Kevin E Bassler was awarded the John and Rebecca Moores Professorship in 2014. Being hired in 1998 he became tenure-track assistant professor in 2000. His PhD thesis (1985-1990) was on statistical mechanics of commensurate-incommensurate phase transitions under the supervision of Robert Griffiths.

Prof. Simon Charles Moss joined the physics department in 1972 performing research on the full gamut of materials from hetero- structures and multilayers to quasi-crystals and decagonal crystals using x-ray and neutron scattering as probes of order in matter. He died of a heart attack on 14 March 2011.

References 

Natural Sciences and Mathematics
Physics departments in the United States